Steve Brown (born November 22, 1946 in Galesville, Wisconsin) is an American curler and curling coach.

Awards
United States Curling Hall of Fame: 1998
U.S. Olympic Committee Curling Coach of the Year: 1996
USA Curling Coach of the Year: 2012, 1996

Teams

Men's

Mixed

Record as a coach of national teams

Personal life
Steve Brown started curling in 1960, when he was 14 years old.

His children, son Craig Brown and daughter Erika Brown, are well-known American curlers too, US champions and World medallists. Steve's wife Diane Brown is also a curler, and Steve and Diane together won the US Mixed championship in 1984.

He is founder and owner of Steve's Curling Supplies, a curling equipment company.

References

External links

USAcurl profile
First family of Madison curling Steve Brown, along with children Craig and Erika, will participate in the Olympic Trials - Tom Mulhern Wisconsin State Journal Feb 19, 2005
Swept up - Isthmus | Madison, Wisconsin
Champion Curler Steve Brown | Photograph | Wisconsin Historical Society
 Video: 

Living people
1946 births
People from Galesville, Wisconsin
Sportspeople from Madison, Wisconsin
American male curlers
American curling champions
American curling coaches